"We Call It Acieed" is the debut single by British musician D Mob. An acid house-influenced song from the debut album A Little Bit of This, a Little Bit of That, it features vocals by Gary Haisman.  The song reached No. 1 on Billboard's Dance Music/Club Play Singles chart and No. 25 on the Hot Dance Music/Maxi-Singles Sales chart in 1989. It also reached number 3 on the UK Singles Chart.

The song is also featured on the compilation albums Dance Massive, Vol. 2 [Phantom], History of Techno [ZYX], Smash Hits 1988 and Acid House Anthems.

Video 
The video features D Mob and singing in front of people with yellow masks in the shapes of triangles, squares and circles, with the occasional mask of an eye. The song involves Haisman chanting "Acieed" through the entire video.
 The yellow smiley face icon had recently been adopted as a symbol of the acid house scene.

The original music video only lasted approximately two minutes long, as the record label FFRR did not think the song would be a hit and chose not to spend further money. Many years later, an unofficial edit of the video was made, stretching the length out to the full 3 minutes and 14 seconds of the radio version by repeating certain parts.

Removal from BBC Playlist 
Because the song seemed to be condoning drug use (despite Danny D's claim that the song was about the music and points that out in the lyrics; Poku also notes that he does not smoke, drink, or take drugs), in October 1988, the BBC removed the song from their playlists. The decision to ban the song came especially after Caron Keating and a smiley face T-shirted Steve Wright enthusiastically introduced the video for the song on the 20 October 1988 edition of Top of the Pops during an acid house backlash from tabloids, and this lead for an absence of any records that referenced acid house on the show until "Stakker Humanoid" by Humanoid two months later.

In popular culture
The track was used as a plot device on the BBC soap EastEnders in 2018.

Charts

See also
 List of number-one dance singles of 1989 (U.S.)

References 

1988 debut singles
1988 songs
FFRR Records singles
1988 controversies
Music controversies
Television controversies in the United Kingdom
D Mob songs
Songs banned by the BBC